St Ives Chase is a bushland suburb on the Upper North Shore of Sydney in the state of New South Wales, Australia. St Ives Chase is 18 kilometres north-west of the Sydney Central Business District in the local government area of Ku-ring-gai Council. St Ives is a more developed adjacent suburb and St Ives Chase covers the area approximately north of Toolang Road and west of Collins Road. The neighbouring suburb of North Turramurra is separated by a section of the Ku-ring-gai Chase National Park. It is a separate suburb from St Ives, which lies to its south.

Transport
By road, St Ives Chase can only be accessed via St Ives. Warrimoo Avenue is the main road used to access streets in St Ives Chase. Many properties sit very close to the bush. As St Ives Chase has no through traffic, there are rarely traffic delays in the suburb. Residents driving from St Ives Chase will first encounter peak hour traffic trying to join or cross Killeaton Street or Mona Vale Road in St Ives. A common route to the city is via the North Shore's Eastern Arterial Road.

Buses to St Ives Chase include Forest Coach Lines route 195 to/from Gordon railway station and route 194/594 from St Ives through St Ives Chase to the city. North Turramurra and Bobbin Head are accessible via bush tracks in the National Park.

Commercial zone

St Ives Chase is almost entirely zoned for either residential or recreational means. The suburb does have a small shopping complex of 5 shops which include a medical centre, seven-day corner shop, a liquor shop, a chemist, Pizza restaurant and a hair dresser. The adjacent Caltex petrol station is the only other commercial outlet in the area.

Population
At the 2011 census, St Ives Chase recorded a population of 3,087.  Of these: 
 The median age was 42 years. Children aged 0–14 years made up 20.4% of the population and people aged 65 years and over made up 17.8% of the population.
 54.9% were born in Australia; the next most common countries of birth were South Africa 12.0%, England 8.3%, New Zealand 2.1%, China (excludes SARs and Taiwan) 1.5% and Hong Kong (SAR of China) 1.3%.
 79.4% only spoke English at home; other languages spoken at home included Cantonese 3.0%, Mandarin 1.7%, Afrikaans 1.3%, Italian 1.2% and Spanish 0.9%.
 90.4% of households were family households, 9.6% were single person households and none were group households.

Wildlife
Situated in the national park, St Ives Chase is the home to a wide variety of flora and fauna, particularly prevalent are brush turkeys. In recent years there has been a rabbit problem in the area, and there have been many attempts to eradicate rabbits in the St Ives Chase side of the National Park.

Sport and clubs
There are two sports grounds in the area, Warrimoo Oval, which is home to the St Ives Football Club, and Toolang Oval, which hosts junior Football and Cricket.

Also located near St Ives Chase near Warrimoo Oval is the North St Ives Scout Club which is a club for children and teenagers run by family volunteers.

References

Suburbs of Sydney
Ku-ring-gai Council
1855 establishments in Australia
Populated places established in 1855
St Ives, New South Wales